The Olden Domain is the second studio album by Norwegian heavy metal band Borknagar, and their first to feature English lyrics. It also marks the beginning of the band's transition to their trademark progressive/folk/black metal sound featured on later records.

This would be the band's last studio album to feature Kristoffer Rygg on vocals. It is also their first album to feature Kai K. Lie on bass, replacing Infernus.

Track listing

Personnel
Kristoffer Rygg (credited as "Fiery G. Maelstrom") – vocals
Øystein G. Brun – acoustic guitar, electric guitar
Kai K. Lie – bass guitar
Ivar Bjørnson – keyboards, synthesizer, sound effects
Erik Brødreskift – drums, percussion

Production
Borknagar - production, arrangements
Matthias Klinkmann - engineer
Eroc - mixing
Christophe Szpajdel – logo

References

External links
Borknagar-The Olden Domain (1997 2nd Album at Borknagar.com)
"The Olden Domain" at discogs

Borknagar albums
1997 albums
Century Media Records albums